Chalfont St Giles is a village and civil parish in southeast Buckinghamshire, England. It is in a group of villages called The Chalfonts, which also includes Chalfont St Peter and Little Chalfont.

"Chalfont" means chalk spring, in reference to the water-carrying capacities of the local terrain. The cockney rhyming slang term "chalfonts", meaning haemorrhoids (piles), is derived from the name of the village. The village has a duck pond that is fed by the River Misbourne. The village sign was designed and painted by Doreen Wilcockson ARCA in 2001.  Chalfont St Giles is famous for the poet Milton's only surviving home.

History
In the Domesday Book of 1086, Chalfont St Giles and Chalfont St Peter were listed as separate Manors with different owners, called 'Celfunte'. They were separate holdings before the Norman Conquest.

The Church of England parish church of Saint Giles is of Norman architecture and dates from the 12th century. The church features a lychgate and wall paintings from the early 14th century. During the English Civil War, some iron cannonballs were embedded in the stonework around the east window; they were believed to have been fired by Oliver Cromwell's troops when camped in the neighbouring field after the Battle of Aylesbury. Three of these balls are now on display in John Milton's Cottage in the village. Bishop Francis Hare is buried in his family mausoleum in the churchyard.

During the Great Plague of London in 1665, John Milton retired to Chalfont St Giles where he completed his epic poem Paradise Lost.  Milton's Cottage still stands in the village, and is open to the public. The inspiration for Paradise Regained is said to have been found in this parish from a conversation with a former pupil, Thomas Ellwood. In 1887, after an attempt was made to relocate the house to America and rebuild it there, a movement was begun locally to purchase the house by local public subscription. Queen Victoria headed the list with a gift of £20, a considerable amount at the time – approximately £2,360 as of 2016.

Like most other rural parishes, it managed its civil affairs through the vestry until the Local Government Act 1894 required all parishes of over 300 people to have a Parish council independent of the Church.
The village was the birthplace of cricketer J. T. Hearne, one of the greatest bowlers of the 1890s and 1900s, who died there in 1944, and of the actress Alexandra Gilbreath.

Notable residents of the village have included Ozzy Osbourne, Harry Golombek, Brian Connolly, Brian Cant, Chicane, Armando Iannucci, Noel Gallagher, and Nick Clegg who became the Liberal Democrats party leader in 2007 and Deputy Prime Minister of the United Kingdom from 2010 to 2015.

The village has given its name to Chalfont, Pennsylvania, which is a borough in Bucks County, Pennsylvania.

The Chiltern Open Air Museum, located immediately outside the Parish boundary, rescues and re-erects historic buildings which face demolition, from medieval to modern. Its collection includes a cottage from around 1600, and a variety of 19th century buildings, within 45 acres of parkland.

Future
High Speed 2 will pass underneath the village in the Chiltern tunnel. A ventilation shaft will be constructed near the village, disguised as a barn.

Amenities
The village is the closest to Hodgemoor Wood, a Site of Special Scientific Interest.

The village is twinned with Graft-De Rijp, Netherlands.

Sport
The local football club is Chalfont Wasps, which was promoted to the Hellenic Football League Premier Division for the 2008–09 season. They play their home games at 'The Nest'. Chalfont St Giles has a tennis club, affiliated to the Lawn Tennis Association. The village is home to Oakland Park Golf Club, and nearby to Harewood Downs Golf Club.

The local cricket club is Chalfont St Giles CC, which plays in the Thames Valley Cricket League and Morrant Chiltern League. They play their home games at Bowstridge Lane in the heart of the village.

Film and television

Chalfont St Giles has been the location of several film and television programmes. It doubled as Walmington-on-Sea in the 1971 film version of Dad's Army. John Laurie, one of the main actors, lived in Chalfont St Peter. The Miller's Tale episode of the BBC Television drama The Canterbury Tales was filmed in and around Chalfont St Giles as was an episode of the BBC Television sitcom As Time Goes By.  It was the location for the filming of Episode 6 of Series 3 of Peep Show.

The village is also mentioned in the series 3 episode of Jeeves and Wooster entitled "Bertie Sets Sail", when Bertie Wooster likens Lord Wilmot Pershaw's demeanour to "a wet weekend in Chalfont St. Giles". Other films and TV shows filmed in Chalfont St Giles include Hammer House of Horror, The Sweeney, and The Big Job (1965), starring Sid James and Dick Emery. The village is ideal for film production due to its close proximity to Pinewood Studios in Iver Heath, and London.

Hamlets
Hamlets in Chalfont St Giles parish include:

 Bottrells Close, located along Bottrells Lane to the west of the village.  Bottrells Close Cottage is the location of the ancient hamlet.
 Chalfont Grove, located to the south of the village along Narcot Lane.  It is the location of the British Forces Broadcasting Service.
 Jordans, located south west of the main village, near Seer Green.
 Stratton Chase, located to the north of Mill Lane.

Notable people
 

Joe Blochel (born 1962), retired professional footballer
Nick Clegg (born 1967), media executive and former Deputy Prime Minister
Gavin Sherlock (born 1969), professor of Genetics at Stanford University

References

External links

The History of Chalfont St Giles
Milton's cottage
Village website

 
Villages in Buckinghamshire
Civil parishes in Buckinghamshire
Chiltern District